The Burgenland state election of 1991 was held in the Austrian state of Burgenland on 23 June 1991.

1991 elections in Austria
State elections in Austria
June 1991 events in Europe